Niigata Albirex BB, formally Niigata Albirex Basketball, is a Japanese basketball club. It is based in Nagaoka, Niigata.

Outline 
The club was founded in 1954 as the company team of Daiwa Securities, a Tokyo-based securities brokerage. In 1991, it joined the Japan Basketball League. In 2000, the company club was dissolved after NSG purchased it, and the club was moved before the 2000–2001 season to Niigata and renamed Albirex.

In 2004, it joined the bj league along with five other clubs.

Team name transition 
 1954: The Daiwa Securities basketball club
 1994: The Daiwa Securities Hotblizzards
 2000: Niigata Albirex
 2006: Niigata Albirex basketball

Roster

Notable players

Coaches
Osamu Kuraishi
Matt Garrison
Fujitaka Hiraoka
Kazuo Nakamura
Kazuhiro Shoji
Shogo Fukuda

Honors 
 Japan Basketball League Div.2
 Champions (2) : 2000/2001, 2001/2002
 bj league
 Runners-up (1) : 2005/2006
 Asia Professional Basketball Invitation Tournament
 4th Place (1) : 2006

Season-by-season records 

Key:
 Win%: Winning percentage
 GB: Games behind

Arenas
City Hall Plaza Aore Nagaoka
Niigata City Higashi General Sports Center
Region Plaza Joetsu

Practice facilities
Nakanoshima Gymnasium

References

External links 
Official web site 

 
Basketball teams in Japan
Albirex Niigata
1954 establishments in Japan
Basketball teams established in 1954